Munir Shakir is a Deobandi Islamic scholar and militant active in Pakistan.

Early life
Shakir was born into a Pashtun family of the Khattak clan in the Karak District of Khyber Pakhtunkhwa.

Radio ministry
Shakir became known after he moved to Bara tehsil, Khyber Agency, where he established an FM pirate radio station.  Using this vehicle, he began to promote his religious beliefs, based in Deobandi theology.  Among his more controversial pronouncements was his alleged statement that opium is halal, provided it is produced and used for medical purposes.

Shakir worked in Kurram Agency until 2004, when he was ejected by tribal elders following a mosque bombing.

Enmity with Pir Saifur Rahman
In 2005, Akhundzada Saif-ur-Rahman Mubarak, a supporter of the more moderate Hanafi Barelvi school of Islam, established his own FM pirate radio station to compete with Shakir's station.  Rivalry between the two clerics increased, causing tribal elders to denounce the two in December 2005 for fomenting sectarian tension.  Both clerics then went into hiding, with Shakir handing control of his radio station and Lashkar-e-Islam organization to Mangal Bagh.  The hostilities peaked around 29 March 2006, when "hundreds" of Shakir's followers gathered in the Badshahkili neighborhood of Bara tehsil to attack Rahman's followers.

Role in Lashkar-e-Islam

In 2004, Shakir founded the organization Lashkar-e-Islam. Shortly thereafter, he was ejected from Bara tehsil, and turned over control of the organization to local driver Mangal Bagh.

References

Pakistani religious leaders
Terrorism in Pakistan
Pashtun people
Deobandis
Living people
People from Karak District
Pirate radio personalities
Leaders of Islamic terror groups
Year of birth missing (living people)